Fionn Petch is a Scottish translator. He was born in Scotland, and lived for long periods in Mexico City and Berlin. He has a doctorate in philosophy from the National University of Mexico (UNAM). As a translator, he has translated fiction, poetry, drama and children's books. He also works on books and exhibition catalogues on art and architecture. Among noted translations are A Straggly Smile by Vanessa Saint Cyr, The Distance Between Us by Renato Cisneros and Fireflies by Luis Sagasti.

References

Scottish translators
Year of birth missing (living people)
Living people